Nothocnide is a genus of flowering plants belonging to the family Urticaceae.

Its native range is Malesia to the Southwestern Pacific.

Species
Species:

Nothocnide discolor 
Nothocnide melastomatifolia 
Nothocnide mollissima 
Nothocnide repanda

References

Urticaceae
Urticaceae genera